Tetraopidion is a genus of beetles in the family Cerambycidae, containing the following species:

 Tetraopidion geminatum Martins, 1969
 Tetraopidion mucoriferum (Thomson, 1867)
 Tetraopidion tetraophtalmum Martins, 1960
 Tetraopidion venezuelanum Martins, 1960

References

Ibidionini